"Don't Stay Away (Till Love Grows Cold)" is a song written by Lefty Frizzell and Loys Sutherland, sung by Frizzell, and released on the Columbia label (catalog no. 20911). In April 1952, it peaked at No. 2 on Billboards country and western best seller and juke box charts. It spent 12 weeks on the charts and was also ranked No. 17 on Billboards 1952 year-end country and western juke box chart and No. 19 on the year-end best seller chart.

See also
 Billboard Top Country & Western Records of 1952

References

Lefty Frizzell songs
1952 songs
Songs written by Lefty Frizzell